Babawande Onaolapo Olabisi is a former professional baseball player for the San Diego Padres. He played college baseball at Stanford University. Olabisi is the first Nigerian-born player to be selected in the MLB First-Year Player Draft and the first to play affiliated baseball.

Early life
Olabisi was born in Lagos, Nigeria to Olagoke Olabisi and Juliet Olabisi. At the age of 5, the Olabisi Family moved to the ARAMCO Compound in Dhahran, Saudi Arabia. in 2000, Olabisi represented the country in the Little League World Series  where he was selected for the All-Star game and Home Run Derby. Olabisi attended St. Stephen's Episcopal School (Austin, Texas) where he was a four-sport athlete (baseball, football, soccer, and track). After high school, Olabisi attended Stanford University where he was called "probably the greatest athlete I've ever had" by head coach, Mark Marquess. Olabisi graduated with an undergraduate degree in Biomechanical Engineering and a graduate degree in Management Science and Engineering.

Professional baseball
Olabisi was selected by the San Diego Padres in the 2009 First-year player draft. The Padres recognized Olabisi as one of the top athletes in the draft. After his rookie season with the AZL Padres, Olabisi was regarded as a top prospect by MLB Prospect Guide. Olabisi's final two seasons were played with the Fort Wayne TinCaps and the Lake Elsinore Storm. During his professional baseball career, Olabisi's off-season activities included the design and development of low-cost high-efficiency medical devices for use in developing countries.

Subsequent career
Since retiring from professional baseball, Olabisi has attended and graduated from Harvard Business School. He has commenced a career in the business management and investing sectors, working at the consulting firm McKinsey & Company and subsequently joined Altamont Capital Partners as an Investment Professional.

References

Living people
Stanford Cardinal baseball players
American people of Yoruba descent
Yoruba sportspeople
Sportspeople from Lagos
Nigerian emigrants to the United States
Nigerian expatriates in Saudi Arabia
Nigerian baseball players
Year of birth missing (living people)
Harvard Business School alumni